New York's 41st State Assembly district is one of the 150 districts in the New York State Assembly. It has been represented by Helene Weinstein since 1981.

Geography 
District 41 is located in Brooklyn, comprising the neighborhoods of Sheepshead Bay, Flatlands, parts of East Flatbush, Midwood and Canarsie.

Recent election results

2022

2020

2018

2016

2014

2012

2010

2008

References

Politics of Brooklyn
41